Johan Andersen (5 May 1902 – 11 May 1968) was a Norwegian politician for the Labour Party.

He was born in Holmestrand.

He was elected to the Norwegian Parliament from the Market towns of Vestfold county in 1945, and was re-elected on five occasions. A year before the end of the last term, he died and was replaced by Willy Jansson.

On the local level he was a member of Horten city council from 1945 to 1947. He chaired the municipal party chapter from 1951 to 1966.

References

1902 births
1968 deaths
Members of the Storting
Labour Party (Norway) politicians
Vestfold politicians
People from Horten
20th-century Norwegian politicians
People from Holmestrand